Archer Township is one of the fifteen townships of Harrison County, Ohio, United States. As of the 2010 census the population was 311.

Geography
Located in the north central part of the county, it borders the following townships:
Rumley Township - north
Green Township - east
German Township - northeast
Cadiz Township - south
Stock Township - west
North Township - northwest

No municipalities are located in Archer Township.

Name and history
It is the only Archer Township statewide. It was established in 1799.

Government
The township is governed by a three-member board of trustees, who are elected in November of odd-numbered years to a four-year term beginning on the following January 1. Two are elected in the year after the presidential election and one is elected in the year before it. There is also an elected township fiscal officer, who serves a four-year term beginning on April 1 of the year after the election, which is held in November of the year before the presidential election. Vacancies in the fiscal officership or on the board of trustees are filled by the remaining trustees.

References

External links
County website

1799 establishments in the Northwest Territory
Townships in Harrison County, Ohio
Populated places established in 1799
Townships in Ohio